The Cab Calloway Orchestra, based at the exclusive Cotton Club in Harlem, was, for more than a decade, one of the most important jazz bands in America. Different lineups featured the best available established musicians.

In 1930, Cab Calloway was hired to replace Duke Ellington at the Cotton Club, and recorded for Brunswick and the ARC dime store labels (Banner, Cameo, Conqueror, Perfect, Melotone, Banner, Oriole, etc.) from 1930–1932. In 1932, he signed with Victor for a year, but he was back on Brunswick in late 1934 through 1936, when he signed with manager Irving Mills's short-lived Variety in 1937, and stayed with Mills when the label collapsed and the sessions were continued on Vocalion through 1939, and then OKeh Records through 1942.

When the Cotton Club closed in 1940, Calloway and his band went on a tour of the United States.

In 1941 Calloway fired Dizzy Gillespie from his orchestra after an onstage fracas. Calloway wrongly accused Gillespie of throwing a spitball; in the ensuing altercation Gillespie stabbed Calloway in the leg with a small knife.

The band broke up in the late 1940s.

Original band members
The first Cab Calloway Orchestra comprised Earres Prince on piano; Walter "Foots" Thomas and Thornton Blue on alto saxes; Andrew Brown on tenor sax; Morris White on banjo; Jimmy Smith on tuba; and DePriest Wheeler on trombone; Leroy Maxey on drums; R.Q. Dickerson and Lammar Wright on trumpets.

Full list of band members

Brass section
Trombones Claude Jones, Lammar Wright, Keg Johnson, DePriest Wheeler, Tyree Glenn, and Quentin Jackson.
Trumpets R.Q. Dickerson, Dizzy Gillespie, Mario Bauza, Adolphus "Doc" Cheatham (1931-9), Reuben Reeves (1931), Shad Collins (mid-1940s), Paul Webster (mid-1940s), and Jonah Jones.
Tuba Jimmy Smith.

Horn section
Saxophones Thornton Blue, Hilton Jefferson, Ben Webster, Leon "Chu" Berry, Chauncey Haughton, Rudy Powell, Andrew Brown, Walter "Foots" Thomas, Ike Quebec, Arville Harris (1931) and Jerry Blake Ben (Benjamin) Whitted (tenor saxophone).

Rhythm section
Piano Earres Prince, Benny Payne, Dave Rivera (mid-1940s)
Guitars Danny Barker
Bass Al Morgan, Milt Hinton
Drums Leroy Maxey, Cozy Cole, J. C. Heard (mid-1940s)

References

American jazz ensembles from New York City
Musical groups established in 1930
Musical groups disestablished in the 1940s
Orchestras based in New York City
Disbanded American orchestras
Musical backing groups
Jazz musicians from New York (state)
1930 establishments in New York City
1940s disestablishments in New York (state)